The Copa Juan Mignaburu was a football friendly competition contested between Argentina and Uruguay national teams between 1935 and 1943. Similar to Copa Premier Honor Argentino, all the editions (five in total) were held in Argentina. The Argentine side largely prevailed over Uruguay, having won all the editions.

The trophy was named after Juan Mignaburu, a politician and football executive who served as coach and president of Club Atlético Independiente between 1911 and 1921, Mignaburu also presided dissident Asociación Amateurs de Football in 1919, where he fiercely opposed professionalism in football. His political career included two periods as major of Avellaneda Partido (1898, 1899–1901).

The cup had its counterpart, Copa Héctor Rivadavia Gómez, held in Uruguay in parallel with this competition.

List of champions 
The following list includes all the editions of the Copa Mignaburu:

Notes

Titles by country

All-time topscorers

See also
 Argentina–Uruguay football rivalry

References

Argentina–Uruguay football rivalry
m
m
m
m
m